The Lanesborough is a 5-star hotel on Hyde Park Corner in Knightsbridge, central London, England. The hotel is operated by the Oetker Collection. It is in neoclassical style and is listed Grade II*.

Opposite are Hyde Park and Apsley House, the London home of the Dukes of Wellington. The hotel is next to Hyde Park Corner tube station.

History

St George's Hospital was opened in the original Lanesborough House, the home in London of the Viscounts Lanesborough, in 1733. By the 1800s, the hospital was falling into disrepair. Lanesborough House was demolished to make way for a new 350-bed facility. Building began in 1827 under architect William Wilkins. The new hospital was operational by 1844, serving continuously as a hospital until transferred to Tooting, south London, in the 1970s, leaving the Hyde Park Corner premises vacant in 1980. The Duke of Westminster took up an option to buy the building for £6,000 (its value in the nineteenth century).

Rosewood Hotels & Resorts refurbished and re-opened the building as a hotel in 1991. Furniture was supplied by Arthur Brett and Sons. Ten years later, the management contract passed to Starwood's St. Regis operation, as its first and only hotel in England. Since November 2014, the Oetker Collection has managed the building.

The Lanesborough was closed for renovation in December 2013 and re-opened in 2015. In 2015, it was reputedly the most expensive hotel in London.

Culinary awards
In 2009, The Lanesborough announced the launch of ‘Apsleys – a Heinz Beck Restaurant’. Chef Heinz Beck was the winner of three Michelin stars for his cuisine at La Pergola in Rome, Italy. ‘Apsleys – a Heinz Beck Restaurant’ began service on 7 September 2009, and was awarded its first Michelin star on 20 January 2010. This is the current fastest time for a new London restaurant to get one, in less than 5 months. The dining room was subsequently rebranded as Céleste for the 2015 opening, and was again awarded a Michelin star in 2016, only to lose it in 2022.

See also
 Earl of Lanesborough

References

External links

 
 The Lanesborough history, photos, review in cosmopolis.ch
 History of St George's Hospital from St George's, University of London
 About our History from the St George's Healthcare NHS Trust

Infrastructure completed in 1844
Hotels in the City of Westminster
Grade II* listed buildings in the City of Westminster
Grade II* listed hotels
Michelin Guide starred restaurants in the United Kingdom
Neoclassical architecture in London
St George's, University of London
Buildings and structures in Hyde Park, London
Hotels established in 1991
1991 establishments in England
Oetker Collection